The 1980 NCAA Skiing Championships were contested at both the Whiteface Ski Resort at Lake Placid, New York and the Stowe Mountain Resort in Stowe, Vermont as part of the 27th annual NCAA-sanctioned ski tournament to determine the individual and team national champions of men's collegiate slalom skiing, cross-country skiing, and ski jumping in the United States.

Vermont, coached by Chip LaCasse, claimed their first team national championship, finishing 20 points ahead of  Utah in the cumulative team standings.

Events
This was the final year that ski jumping was included in the event program.

Venue

This year's NCAA skiing championships were co-hosted at the Whiteface Ski Resort in Lake Placid, New York and the Stowe Mountain Resort in Stowe, Vermont. 

These were the first championships held in the state of New York and fourth in Vermont (1955, 1961, 1973, and 1980).

Team scoring

See also
List of NCAA skiing programs

References

NCAA Skiing Championships
NCAA Skiing Championships
NCAA Skiing Championships
NCAA Skiing Championships
NCAA Skiing Championships
NCAA Skiing Championships
NCAA Skiing Championships
NCAA Skiing Championships